LAGEOS, Laser Geodynamics Satellite or Laser Geometric Environmental Observation Survey, are a series of two scientific research satellites designed to provide an orbiting laser ranging benchmark for geodynamical studies of the Earth. Each satellite is a high-density passive laser reflector in a very stable medium Earth orbit (MEO).

Function and operation 
Of these retroreflectors, 422 are made from fused silica glass while the remaining 4 are made from germanium to obtain measurements in the infrared for experimental studies of reflectivity and satellite orientation. They have no on-board sensors or electronics, and are not attitude-controlled.

Measurements are made by transmitting pulsed laser beams from Earth ground stations to the satellites. The laser beams then return to Earth after hitting the reflecting surfaces; the travel times are precisely measured, permitting ground stations in different parts of the Earth to measure their separations to better than one inch in thousands of miles.

The LAGEOS satellites make it possible to determine positions of points on the Earth with extremely high accuracy due to the stability of their orbits.
The high mass-to-area ratio and the precise, stable (attitude-independent) geometry of the LAGEOS spacecraft, together with their extremely regular orbits, make these satellites the most precise position references available.

Mission goals 
The LAGEOS mission consists of the following key goals:
 Provide an accurate measurement of the satellite's position with respect to Earth.
 Determine the planet's shape (geoid).
 Determine tectonic plate movements associated with continental drift.

Ground tracking stations located in many countries (including the US, Mexico, France, Germany, Poland, Australia, Egypt, China, Peru, Italy, and Japan) have ranged to the satellites and data from these stations are available worldwide to investigators studying crustal dynamics.

There are two LAGEOS spacecraft, LAGEOS-1 launched in 1976, and LAGEOS-2 launched in 1992. , both LAGEOS spacecraft are routinely tracked by the ILRS network.

Time capsule 

LAGEOS-1 (which is predicted to re-enter the atmosphere in 8.4 million years) also contains a 4 in × 7 in plaque designed by Carl Sagan to indicate to future humanity when LAGEOS-1 was launched. The plaque includes the numbers 1 to 10 in binary. In the upper right is a diagram of the Earth orbiting the Sun, with a binary number 1 indicating one revolution, equaling one year. It then shows 268,435,456 years in the past (binary: 228), indicated by a left arrow and the arrangement of the Earth's continents at that time (during the Permian period). The present arrangement of the Earth's continents is indicated with a 0 and both forward and backward arrows. Then the estimated arrangement of the continents in 8.4 million years with a right facing arrow and 8,388,608 in binary (223). LAGEOS itself is shown at launch on the 0 year, and falling to the Earth in the 8.4 million year diagram.

Launch data

 LAGEOS 1, launched 4 May 1976, NSSDC ID 1976-039A, NORAD number 8820
 LAGEOS 2, deployed 23 October 1992 from STS-52, NSSDC ID 1992-070B, NORAD number 22195

See also
 GEOS-3
 PAGEOS
 Geodesy
 Post-glacial rebound
 List of laser articles
 List of laser ranging satellites
 LARES (satellite) a similar object made of mostly tungsten

References

Further reading 

 The Conversation (May 3, 2017) Space bling: ‘jewelled’ LAGEOS satellites help us to measure the Earth,

External links 

 
 LAGEOS-1, -2 (International Laser Ranging Service)
 LAGEOS-1 page at US National Space Science Data Center
 LAGEOS-2 page at US National Space Science Data Center
  LAGEOS-1, -2 (eoPortal.org)
 LAGEOS video (1976) at AParchive.com
 LAGEOS Collection, The University of Alabama in Huntsville Archives and Special Collections
 Bob Spencer Collection, The University of Alabama in Huntsville Archives and Special Collections Files of Robert Spencer, planner on the LAGEOS project.

NASA satellites orbiting Earth
Time capsules
Laser ranging satellites
Italian Space Agency
Satellite series
Gravimetry satellites